Azra (1889–1909) was an American Thoroughbred racehorse. He was bred in Kentucky by George J. Long and raced under the colors of his Bashford Manor Stable. His sire was Reform, a son of the very important sire Leamington. Azra was out of the mare Albia whose sire, Alarm, also sired Himyar.

Trained by John H. Morris, Azra's regular jockey was Alonzo Clayton. At age two, he won one of the important races for his age group, the Champagne Stakes. At age three, Azra won the Kentucky Derby in a race against just two other horses, the smallest field in the history of the race. He went on to win the Clark Handicap and the Travers Stakes.

Azra was not successful at stud and died in 1909  at the age of 20 at Bashford Manor Stable.

Pedigree

References
 Azra's pedigree and partial racing stats

1889 racehorse births
1909 racehorse deaths
Racehorses bred in Kentucky
Racehorses trained in the United States
Kentucky Derby winners
Thoroughbred family A1